Li Yixiang, also known as Li Qiang (李强), is a Chinese actor. He appeared in movies such as Ji Quan Bu Ning, Crazy Lottery. In 2002, he starred as one of the two murderous con men in director Li Yang's Blind Shaft, opposite Wang Baoqiang as his naive would-be victim. Li shared the Golden Kinnaree for Best Actor at the 2004 Bangkok International Film Festival along with Wang, and fellow Blind Shaft co-star, Wang Shuangbao.

Li went on to star in Lost and Found, Ma Liwen's black comedy about a migrant worker in Beijing.

Selected filmography

References

External links 
 (as Qiang Li)
Li Yixiang at the Chinese Movie Database

Chinese male film actors
Chinese male television actors
Living people
Year of birth missing (living people)
Chinese male stage actors